Dogfish Head Brewery is a brewing company based in Milton, Delaware founded by Sam and Mariah Calagione and, as of 2019, owned by the Boston Beer Company.  It opened in 1995 and produces 262,000 barrels of beer annually. 

Select brews (including many of the brewery's seasonal and one-off selections) can be found in 31 U.S. states, plus Washington, D.C. Dogfish Head also licenses "Dogfish Head Alehouse" with three locations in Gaithersburg, Maryland, Falls Church, Virginia, and Fairfax, Virginia. Beer-paired food and vintage bottles of Dogfish Head's seasonal beers are available at their alehouses, as well as kegged offerings of their staple beers. The company also has a restaurant called Dogfish Head Brewings & Eats along with a seafood restaurant called Chesapeake & Maine that only sources seafood from the eponymous locations. Both are located in Rehoboth Beach, Delaware.

The brewery was featured prominently in the documentary Beer Wars and was the subject of the Discovery Channel series Brew Masters, which premiered Sunday, November 21, 2010. The brewery takes its name from Dogfish Head, Maine, where Calagione spent summers as a child.

History 
Sam Calagione started brewing in his kitchen in New York City, where he created his first beer out of overripe cherries with his roommates Ken Marino and Joe Lo Truglio. Dogfish Head has brew houses in Rehoboth, Lewes, and Milton, Delaware. The first successful beer that Dogfish Head produced was Midas Touch, which was brewed with honey, white Muscat grapes, and saffron. Although it started by only selling beer in the state of Delaware, Dogfish Head became one of the most profitable microbreweries in the United States. As of 2017 it distributed its beer in 38 states, the most recent being Louisiana.

Calagione sources ingredients from around the world. Dogfish Head has become one of the most watched and well-respected breweries in the country thanks in large part to Calagione's unconventional brewing methods. These ingredients made it possible for his company to grow. The company used to be the smallest microbrewery in the United States, with Calagoione starting with three very small kegs with propane burners beneath them. Dogfish Head's brewery in Rehoboth, Delaware, originally produced only 10 gallons of beer per day when it opened in June 1995. By 2018, Dogfish Head had become one of America's largest and most well-known breweries, producing around 15,000 gallons of beer per day.

Acquisition by Boston Beer Co.
In 2019, Calagione had informal talks with Jim Koch, co-founder of the Samuel Adams brewing Boston Beer Company, at the annual Extreme Beer Fest in Boston. Within a few months, they were purchased by Boston Beer Co. Dogfish Head announced the acquisition by the Boston Beer Company for $300 million on May 9, 2019. As part of the merger, Calagione and his wife, Mariah, converted their Dogfish Head stock into Boston Beer Co. stock, thereby becoming the second largest non-institutional owners of the merged companies.

Products
Dogfish Head tends to produce experimental or "extreme" beers, such as the tongue-in-cheek "Liquor de Malt", a bottle-conditioned malt liquor, which typically comes in a Dogfish Head brown paper bag.  Dogfish Head products often use non-standard ingredients, such as green raisins in Raison D'Être ale.  Some beers, including the WorldWide Stout, 120 Minute India Pale Ale, and the raspberry-flavored strong ale Fort, are highly alcoholic, reaching 18% to 20% alcohol by volume (typical beers have around 3% to 7% alcohol by volume).

One of Dogfish Head's more notable odd beers was a green beer called Verdi Verdi Good, produced in 2005 and sold only on draft.  The beer was not colored green artificially; rather, the green color was derived from brewing a Dortmunder style beer that contained spirulina, or blue-green algae.

Pangaea, first released in 2003, is a Belgian-style strong pale ale made with ingredients from every continent on Earth, including: crystallized ginger from Australia, water from Antarctica, basmati rice from Asia, muscavado sugar from Africa, quinoa from South America, European yeast, and North American maize.  The name Pangaea refers to the eponymous super-continent which existed about 250 million years ago.

The New York Times in 2010 profiled the brewery's efforts to make chicha beer, a traditional Latin American beverage made from maize, which requires chewing the corn and spitting it in a communal pot.

In 2020 the brewery began producing hand sanitiser in response to the COVID-19 pandemic.

IPAs 
Dogfish Head's best-selling product is its line of India Pale Ales (IPAs), which are offered in eight varieties:

 60 Minute IPA (denoting the length of the boil with which hops are continually added)
 90 Minute IPA
 120 Minute IPA
 Sixty-One, a beer-wine hybrid brewed with Syrah grape must
 Aprihop, a Spring seasonal IPA brewed with apricots
 Burton Baton, an imperial oak-aged IPA
 Hazy-O, a hazy IPA brewed with oats and wheat
 75 Minute IPA (cask or bottle conditioned)

The longer hops are boiled, the more hop isomerization takes place, and the more bitterness is imparted to the beer. The 60 Minute is described by the company as "a session IPA brewed with Warrior, Amarillo and Simcoe" and rated at 60 IBUs. Dogfish Head introduced a device in 2003 jokingly called Randall the Enamel Animal, an "organoleptic hop transducer module" which "Randallizes" a given beer by passing the beer through a large plastic tube filled with a flavor enhancer, often raw hops, though adaptations such as fruits and coffee beans amongst others have also been used. The alcohol in the beer lifts oils off the raw hops and imparts even more hop flavor and aroma to beers that were already hoppy to begin with.

The 75 Minute IPA was developed in 2008, and has been produced in very limited quantities, and typically distributed to vendors in firkins. The beer—nicknamed "Johnny Cask" and featuring a mascot resembling a young Johnny Cash tapping a firkin with a mallet—is made from a mixture of the 60 and 90 Minutes IPAs, and undergoes a separate cask conditioning which includes the addition of maple syrup. As a variation on the 75 Minute IPA, the Alehouse 75 is also available. It is a mixture of the 60 and 90 Minute offerings, yet is served in a standard Sankey-style keg, rather than a firkin.

Ancient Ales

In the late 90s, Dogfish Head started an "Ancient Ales" series, in which beer recipes were created based upon the chemical analysis of residue found on pottery and drinking vessels from various archaeological sites. These beers have been produced in collaboration with molecular archaeologist Dr. Pat McGovern of the University of Pennsylvania.  As of 2010, four such brews have been crafted, and only one (Midas Touch) is produced year-round. The others are produced on a limited basis.
Midas Touch Golden Elixir (first released in 1999). A strong ale based on residue found on drinking vessels from the tomb of King Midas, dating back to the 8th century BC. Defining ingredients include Muscat grapes, honey, and saffron. (See section below for more information.)
Chateau Jiahu (first released in 2006). A spiced strong ale based on residue from pottery found in the Neolithic village of Jiahu (in central China), dating to the 7th millennium BC. Some defining ingredients include rice flakes, wildflower honey, hawthorn fruit, and Chrysanthemum flowers. As of 2009, this is the oldest known beer recipe to be brewed in the modern age.
Theobroma (first released in 2008). A chocolate beer based on residue found on pottery discovered in Honduras dating to approximately 1200 BC. Some defining ingredients include Aztec cocoa powder, honey, and annatto.
Ta Henket (first released in 2010, bottles released in late 2011). This beer was created to incorporate ancient ingredients and techniques described in Egyptian hieroglyphics. It was brewed with emmer, loaves of hearth baked bread, dom-palm fruit, chamomile, and zatar. Fermentation was carried out by a native Egyptian saccharomyces wild yeast strain captured from the air in Egypt.

Midas Touch
Midas Touch Golden Elixir, marketed as Midas Touch, was first marketed in June 2001. The recipe for this beverage is based on the chemical analysis of residues found in clay vessels believed to date back to the 8th century BC. Originally discovered in Gordium, Turkey during a 1957 dig by archaeologist Rodney Young, the content of these vessels was left unknown for 40 years. In 1997, molecular archeologist Dr. Patrick McGovern received a phone call from a former student of his informing him of a residue on clay jars from the tomb of King Midas. Dr. McGovern quickly did chemical analysis finding all aspects of the drink except for the spicing agent but made an assumption of saffron due to regional availability.

In March 2000, Calagione attended a special dinner for beer writer Michael Jackson. At this time McGovern and Calagione met and discussed recreating the brew. In early 2001 the new beverage was served at a dinner recreating the funeral feast of King Midas. At $150 a plate the meal was a benefit to support the Chemical Archaeology program at University of Pennsylvania.

Dogfish Head brewery dispenses approximately 1,700-1,800 cases per month to distributors. At the time of discovery Midas Touch Golden Elixir was the oldest fermented beverage recipe discovered. Dogfish Head brewery still today holds the record with a 9,000 yr old recipe used for Chateau Jiahu, which was released in July 2007.

The ingredients for the original 7.5% ABV recipe in 2001 included yellow muscat grapes, lightly toasted 2-row barley malt, thyme, honey and saffron. The ingredients for the 9% ABV recipe include barley, white Muscat grapes, honey and saffron.

Noble Rot
In 2010, Calagione collaborated with Washington winemaker Jarrod Boyle of Alexandria Nicole Cellars to produce a "hybrid" beer-wine beverage labeled Noble rot. A saison-style beer, the brewery uses botrytis-infected Viognier and Pinot gris grapes from Alexandria Nicole's Destiny Ridge Vineyard in the Horse Heaven Hills AVA in the brew. This results in a beer with 49.5% of the fermentable sugars coming from grapes that finishes with a 9% alcohol level. Alexandria Nicole presses the grapes, leaving the skins with the must, and Dogfish co-ferments the Viognier and grains while adding the Pinot gris later in the process. In 2012, the beer went nationwide in the United States in more than 27 states from coast to coast and was received with critical acclaim.

Sah'tea
In 2009, the Dogfish Head team began experimenting to produce their own version of the traditional Finnish-style beer called sahti. Traditional sahti is brewed with a variety of grains, malted and unmalted, including barley, rye, wheat, and oats; then flavored with juniper berries in addition to, or instead of, hops. The old-school style of brewing sahti also includes the step of heating hot rocks over a fire and using them to boil the wort. They departed from the traditional recipe, however, with the creative inclusion of Maya Tea Company's Original Chai tea in their brew, resulting in a rich, malty, and lightly spiced brew.

List of beers brewed 

Source: Dogfish Head Brewery - The Brews

Collaborations and events

Microdistillery 
Dogfish Head also operates a microdistillery at the Rehoboth Beach brewpub. Spirits are hand-distilled in a small pot still and often, like their beers, tend toward unique and non-traditional formulations. The distillery is very small; Dogfish Head spirits are distributed only in Delaware and a handful of other states.

Partnerships 
Dogfish Head often collaborates with other businesses outside of the beer industry. Dogfish Head has worked with the Grateful Dead to create a strong pale ale called American Beauty, a pickle company in Brooklyn, NY called Brooklyn Brine to create a pickle with beer ingredients, and an old glass company in Europe to design a unique IPA glass. In addition, Dogfish Head has worked with many other businesses outside of the beer industry. Calagione believes the collaboration with businesses like these distinguishes the Dogfish Head brand.

Dogfish Head will be one of the main partners in Birreria, the roof-top brewpub being constructed at Mario Batali's Eataly project in New York City. They had originally planned on collaborating with 3 other breweries - Russian River Brewing Company, as well as Birrificio Baladin and Birra del Borgo, both from Italy, but Russian River Brewing Company withdrew. They aim to craft rustic, artisanal beers that will pair directly with food served at the restaurant. The beers were brewed in a copper-clad brewing system and will be unpasteurized, unfiltered, naturally carbonated, and hand-pulled through traditional beer engines, recalling old world Italian craft brewing. The Eataly brewpub opened in 2011.

Media 
Calagione and the brewery were the focus of Brew Masters, a Discovery Channel series that gave viewers an inside look at the brewery's operations, starting with the recipe development process and through the bottling and packaging process. The series premiered on Sunday, November 21, 2010 with an episode focusing on the creation of the Bitches Brew beer to commemorate the Miles Davis album of the same name. The final episode aired on December, 16th 2011 and chronicled the brewing of Chateau Jiahu, one of their Ancient Ales.

Dogfish Head's Brewings & Eats restaurant was featured in a December 2021 episode of the Cooking Channel's Man v. Food.

Sponsorships 
Dogfish Head is the annual lead sponsor of Beer Advocate's Extreme Beer Fest in Boston, Massachusetts. Each year, Dogfish Head brews a special beer for the festival in collaboration with the Alström brothers of Beer Advocate. This special beer's name is voted on by visitors to the Beer Advocate website. The beer brewed for 2010's festival was "Wrath of Pecant". In addition to the year's special beer, Dogfish Head (like most other breweries) bring specially-altered version of normal beers such as 120 minute IPA pressurized through whole-leaf hops, Red & White pressurized through orange peels, and World Wide Stout pressurized through espresso beans in 2010.

References

External links 
Dogfish Head official web site
Dogfish Head Alehouse restaurants
Inc. Magazine profile
International Mead Festival award winners
Recreating King Midas' Golden Elixir
Patrick E. McGovern Biomolecular Archaeology Laboratory
Oral History Interview with Sam Calagione, Hagley Digital Archives

American beer brands
Beer brewing companies based in Delaware
Restaurants in Delaware
Buildings and structures in Sussex County, Delaware
Companies based in Sussex County, Delaware
1995 establishments in Delaware
Food and drink companies established in 1995
2019 mergers and acquisitions